Joel Quashie (born 16 June 2001) is a Saint Vincent and the Grenadines international footballer who plays for the Saint Vincent and the Grenadines national football team.

Career statistics

International

References

External links
 
 Joel Quashie at Caribbean Football Database

2001 births
Living people
Association football midfielders
Saint Vincent and the Grenadines footballers
Saint Vincent and the Grenadines international footballers
Saint Vincent and the Grenadines youth international footballers
Saint Vincent and the Grenadines under-20 international footballers